Barbi-Jenny Pilvre-Storgård (born 19 April 1963) is an Estonian journalist, lecturer and politician. She was a member of XII and XIII Riigikogu.

She has been a member of Estonian Social Democratic Party.

References

Living people
1963 births
Estonian journalists
Estonian educators
Social Democratic Party (Estonia) politicians
Women members of the Riigikogu
Members of the Riigikogu, 2011–2015
Members of the Riigikogu, 2015–2019
University of Tartu alumni
Academic staff of Tallinn University
21st-century Estonian women politicians